José Alejandro Gómez Monteverde (born 13 July 1977) is a Mexican film director. His first film, Bella took top prize at the 2006 Toronto International Film Festival by winning the “People's Choice Award”.

In 2007, Monteverde received the US Citizenship and Immigration Services' "Outstanding American by Choice" Award, which recognizes the achievements of naturalized U.S. citizens.

Career

Films 
Monteverde wrote and directed Bella, a film that took top prize at the 2006 Toronto International Film Festival by winning the “People's Choice Award”. Bella was produced by Sean Wolfington, Eduardo Verástegui, Leo Severino, and Denise Pinckley. Monteverde and the filmmakers received honors for Bella from the Smithsonian and the White House. The Smithsonian Latino Center also honored Monteverde with their "Legacy Award". After US President George W. Bush and First Lady Laura Bush saw the film, Monteverde was invited to sit with Laura in her private box during the annual State of the Union speech in 2007.

Monteverde directed and co-wrote Little Boy, a film set during World War II, released in 2015.

Monteverde directed and co-wrote  Sound of Freedom, starring Jim Caviezel and Mira Sorvino. It was shot in 2018 and was set to be released by 2020, but because of the coronavirus pandemic, its release date was pushed back and it has yet to be released.

Accolades 
In 2022, Monteverde was given a Humanitarian Award by the Coronado Island Film Festival.

Personal life
Monteverde married American actress Ali Landry on 8 April 2006 in San Miguel de Allende, Mexico. They have three children: a daughter born in July 2007, and sons born in October 2011, and July 2013. Their son Valentin Francesco's middle name was inspired by Pope Francis, as Monteverde and Landry met him while she was pregnant and he blessed the baby.

His father, Juan Manuel Gómez Fernández, and brother, Juan Manuel Gómez Monteverde, were found dead with fatal head wounds in Pueblo Viejo, in the Mexican state of Veracruz, on September 19, 2015, approximately two weeks after they were kidnapped from their home in nearby Tamaulipas. On November 9, 2015, six people were arrested for the kidnapping and murder of Gómez Fernández and Gómez Monteverde. The suspects were allegedly holding six Central American migrants hostage at the time of their arrest, according to the Chief of the Mexican Federal Police.

References

External links

1977 births
Mexican film directors
People from Tampico, Tamaulipas
Living people